Johannes Willem "Hans" van der Hoek (5 May 1933, Rotterdam, Netherlands – 4 February 2017) was a Dutch footballer who was under contract at Feyenoord, SC Enschede, and ADO.

Statistics

Club band

Netherlands National Football Team

See also 
 List of Feyenoord players 
 List of Netherlands international footballers

External links 
 
 Interlands van Hans van der Hoek op voetbalstats.nl (Dutch)

1933 births
2017 deaths
Dutch footballers
Netherlands international footballers
Association football defenders
Feyenoord players
Sportclub Enschede players
ADO Den Haag players
Eredivisie players
Footballers from Rotterdam